The Kalambo Falls Prehistoric Sites (Eneo la kale la maporomoko ya Kalambo in Swahili)  is an archaeological site in Kapele ward in Kalambo District inside Rukwa Region of Tanzania. Professor John Desmond Clark explored the site from 1956 to 1959. Excavations in the lakebeds uncovered a stone age sequence from the early stone age to the iron age, with the majority of it stratified in residential floors.

References

Archaeological sites in Tanzania